This is a list of awards and decorations received by Kim Jong-il. According to North Korean sources, North Korea "conferred ... the title of Hero of the DPRK four times, the Order of Kim Il Sung four times, Kim Il Sung Prize two times, 22 orders and 9 medals" on Kim Jong-il. Additionally, "[m]any countries and international organizations conferred 39 orders, 141 medals and 201 honorary titles on him".

North Korean

Foreign

See also
Awards and decorations received by Kim Il-sung
Awards and decorations received by Leonid Brezhnev
List of awards and honours bestowed upon Joseph Stalin
List of awards and honours bestowed upon Fidel Castro
List of awards and honours bestowed upon Muammar Gaddafi
Awards and decorations received by Josip Broz Tito
Orders, decorations, and medals of North Korea

References

Works cited

Further reading

Kim Jong-il
Kim, Jong-il